The Port Authority of Jamaica (PAJ) is an agency of the Ministry of Transport and Mining responsible for the: 
 regulation and development of Jamaica's ports and shipping industry
 safety of all vessels navigating the ports of entry
 regulation of tariffs on goods passing through the public wharves.

Ports controlled
The primary ports for which it is responsible include:
In Kingston

Kingston Container Terminal
North Terminal
South Terminal (Gordon Cay)  
West Terminal 
Fifth Terminal

Elsewhere

Lucea
Montego Bay
Ocho Rios
Port Antonio
Port Esquivel
Port Kaiser
Port Rhoades
Rio Bueno
Rocky Point
Falmouth

History
The Port Authority was established as a statutory corporation under the Port Authority Act, 1972. A Commercial Free Zone and Distribution Hub for the Americas is currently under development. Since 2008, the Port of Kingston has begun expansions to improve its facilities in response to the Panama Canal Expansion. Ultimately, Jamaica hopes to become the main transshipment hub in the Western Hemisphere and become a developed nation.

The Port Authority recently opened a new port for cruise ships in Falmouth, Trelawny.  The new Falmouth, Jamaica Port of call is home to many merchants and cruise lines like Royal Caribbean allowing many tourists to enjoy the port and surrounding natural beauty of Jamaica.  The Port Authority also invited Air Ambulance Jamaica to monitor and provide emergency services to any tourist or local with any medical condition.

See also
Kingston Harbour

References

External links
Port Authority of Jamaica
Ministry of Transport and Works

Water transport in Jamaica
Ministries and agencies of the government of Jamaica
Port authorities
Government agencies established in 1972